Richard Harold Fowler (5 March 1887 – 27 October 1970) was an English first-class cricketer who played in four matches for Worcestershire in 1921.

Fowler was a clergyman, and after taking career-best figures of 5–33 against Gloucestershire at Stourbridge was informed that he would have been no-balled had he not had that vocation.

He was born in Islington, London, and died aged 83 in Clent, Worcestershire.

References

External links
 

1887 births
1970 deaths
English cricketers
Worcestershire cricketers